Sălăjeni may refer to several villages in Romania:

 Sălăjeni, a village in town of Sebiş, Arad County
 Sălăjeni, a village in Bocşa Commune, Sălaj County